Stéphane Carnot (born 10 July 1972) is a former French footballer who played as a midfielder.

Carnot played in Jean Tigana's Monaco side which defeated Manchester United knocking them out of the Champions League in 1998 on away goals after a 1–1 draw at Old Trafford. Whilst at Guingamp he won the 1996 UEFA Intertoto Cup, scoring the decisive goal in the second leg of the final against FC Rotor Volgograd.

Personal life
Carnot is the father of the footballer Louis Carnot.

Honours
 UEFA Intertoto Cup: 1996
 Trophée des Champions: 1997

References

1972 births
Living people
Sportspeople from Quimper
Association football midfielders
French footballers
En Avant Guingamp players
AS Monaco FC players
AJ Auxerre players
Entente SSG players
Ligue 1 players
Ligue 2 players
Footballers from Brittany